The Forests Act was an Act of Parliament passed in New Zealand in 1949. The Act is administered in the Ministry for Primary Industries.

See also
Forestry in New Zealand

External links
Text of the Act

Statutes of New Zealand
Forestry in New Zealand
1949 in New Zealand law